Andrew J. Gebara is a United States Air Force major general who serves as the commander of the Eighth Air Force since August 16, 2021, replacing Major General Mark E. Weatherington. He most recently served as Director of Strategic Plans, Programs, and Requirements of the Air Force Global Strike Command. Previously, he was the Deputy Senior Director for Defense Policy and Strategy of the National Security Council.  

In January 2023, Gebara was nominated for promotion to lieutenant general and assignment as deputy chief of staff for strategic deterrence and nuclear integration of the United States Air Force.

References

External links

Year of birth missing (living people)
Living people
Place of birth missing (living people)
United States Air Force generals